Ved-ava is a water deity, common to several Finnic peoples traditionally dependent on fishing.  She is also sometimes associated with fertility.  She is generally depicted as a water creature resembling a mermaid, with long hair, large breasts, and the lower body of a fish complete with tail, and is sometimes said to play or sing, seducing humans with her music. Fishermen sacrificed to her the first of their catch and observed numerous taboos related to her while fishing. Seeing Ved-ava boded ill, most often drowning. She has been regarded as the spirit of a drowned person or simply as a personification of the water itself.

Among the Mordvins (an area in what is now Western Russia) she was the Water Mother, ruler of the waters and their bounty; she is known as Vete-ema among the Estonians and Veen emo among the Finns.

References

 "Ved-ava." Britannica Concise Encyclopedia from Encyclopædia Britannica. Accessed May 13, 2006.
 "Ved-ava." Encyclopædia Britannica (from Encyclopædia Britannica Premium Service). Accessed May 13, 2006.

Finnish goddesses
Sea and river goddesses
Estonian goddesses